The Pity of It All: A Portrait of Jews In Germany, 1743–1933 is a 2002 book by Amos Elon. The book describes the history of the German Jews between the years 1743 and 1933. The book's narrative focuses on the constant efforts of the German Jews to assimilate and become an integral part of their host country.

References 

History books about Jews and Judaism
History books about the Holocaust
2002 non-fiction books